Santa María del Monte de Cea is a municipality located in the province of León, Castile and León, Spain. According to the 2004 census (INE), the municipality has a population of 331 inhabitants.

Within the municipality there are the following settlements: Banecidas, Castellanos, Santa María del Monte de Cea, Villacintor and Villamizar.

See also
 Tierra de Campos
 Leonese language
 Kingdom of León

References

Municipalities in the Province of León